Gotani is a settlement in Kenya's Coast Province. During the 1940s it was a major hub for the illegal ivory trade.

References 

Populated places in Coast Province